Ledi Sayadaw U Ñaṇadhaja (1 December 1846 – 27 June 1923) was an influential Theravada Buddhist monk. He was recognized from a young age as being developed in both the theory (Abhidhamma) and practice of Buddhism and so was revered as being scholarly. He wrote many books on Dhamma in Burmese and these were accessible even to a serious lay person, hence he was responsible for spreading Dhamma to all levels of society and reviving the traditional practice of Vipassanā meditation, making it more available for renunciates and lay people alike.

Biography
Sayadaw began his studies at age 20 in Mandalay at Thanjaun. While there he was considered to be a bright and ambitious young monk but his work was scholarly; there is no evidence that Sayadaw engaged in a serious meditation practice during his years in Mandalay. Leaving Mandalay after a great fire in 1883 caused the loss of his home and his written work to that time, Sayadaw returned to the village of his youth.

Soon, Sayadaw founded a forest monastery in the "Ledi forest" and began practicing and teaching intensive meditation. It was from this monastery that he would take his name, Ledi Sayadaw, meaning "respected teacher of the Ledi forest." In 1885, Ledi Sayadaw wrote the Nwa-myitta-sa, a poetic prose letter that argued that Burmese Buddhists should not kill cattle and eat beef, since Burmese farmers depended on them as beasts of burden to maintain their livelihoods, that the marketing of beef for human consumption threatened the extinction of buffalo and cattle and that the practice was ecologically unsound. He subsequently led successful beef boycotts during the colonial era, despite the presence of beef eating among locals and influenced a generation of Burmese nationalists in adopting this stance.

In 1900, Sayadaw gave up control of the monastery and pursued more focused meditation in the mountain caves near the banks of the Chindwin River.

At other times he traveled throughout Burma. Because of his knowledge of pariyatti (theory), he was able to write many books on Dhamma in both Pali and Burmese languages such as, Paramattha-dipani (Manual of Ultimate Truth), Nirutta-dipani, a book on Pali grammar and The Manuals of Dhamma. At the same time he kept alive the pure tradition of patipatti (practice) by teaching the technique of Vipassana to a few people.

Legacy
Ledi Sayadaw was one of the foremost Burmese Buddhist figures of his age. He was instrumental in reviving the traditional practice of Vipassana, making it more available for renunciates and lay people alike. Many of his works are still available, including in English through the Buddhist Publication Society.

After Ledi Sayadaw died in 1923, influential teachers, such as U Ba Khin, Mother Sayamagyi, SN Goenka, Mahasi Sayadaw, and many others, spread the teachings to the West.

Bibliography
A Manual of Excellent Man
A Manual of Light and The Manual of the Path to Higher Knowledge: Two Expositions of the Buddha’s Teaching
The Requisites of Enlightenment
Manual of Insight (Vipassanā Dīpanī)
 Manual of Conditional Relations (Patthanuddesa Dīpanī)
 Manual of Right Views (Vipassanā Dīpanī)
 Manual of the Four Noble Truths (Catusacca Dīpanī)
Manual of the Factors of Enlightenment (Bodhipakkhiya Dīpanī)
 Manual of the Constituents of the Path (Magganga Dīpanī)
Manual of Mindfulness of Breathing (Anapana Dīpanī)
 Five Kinds of Light (Alin Kyan)
 5 Questions on Kamma; Anattanisamsā
Noble Eightfold Path and Its Factors
Buddhist Philosophy of Relations

References

External links
 On-line Collection of Writings of Ven. Ledi Sayadaw 
  A longer bio of Ledi Sayadaw
 The Advantages of Realizing the Doctrine of Anattaa

Theravada Buddhist monks
1846 births
1923 deaths
Burmese Buddhist monks
Burmese philosophers
Burmese scholars of Buddhism
People from Sagaing Region
Burmese recipients of Agga Maha Pandita